Läther (or "Leather") is the sixty-fifth official album by Frank Zappa. It was released posthumously as a three-CD set on Rykodisc in 1996. The album's title is derived from bits of comic dialog that link the songs. Zappa also explained that the name is a joke, based on "common bastardized pronunciation of Germanic syllables by the Swiss."

Läther integrates many aspects of Zappa's musical oeuvre — heavy rock, orchestral works, and complex jazz flavored instrumentals, along with Zappa's distinctive electric guitar solos and satirical lyrics, all edited together in a seemingly random way.

The Läther album was intended for release in 1977 as a four-LP box set, but it never appeared  officially in this format. A variety of bootleg recordings of this material were widely distributed. One of these was a four-LP box on the "Edison Record" label and appeared to be  professionally packaged. Some may have believed this was authorized, despite the fact Zappa's name did not appear on the album.

Background
Zappa's relationship with manager Herb Cohen ended in May 1976. Zappa and Cohen were the co-owners of the DiscReet records label, which was distributed by Warner Bros. Records. After Cohen cashed one of Zappa's royalty checks from Warner and kept the money for himself, Zappa sued Cohen. Zappa was also upset with Cohen for signing acts he did not approve.

Cohen filed a lawsuit against Zappa in return, which froze the money Zappa and Cohen were expecting to receive from an out-of-court settlement with MGM/Verve over the rights to Zappa's early Mothers of Invention recordings. The MGM settlement was eventually finalized in mid 1977 after two years of negotiations. Legal issues also prevented Zappa having access to any of his previously recorded material during the trials. Zappa re-negotiated with Warner and had his contract re-assigned in October 1976. He delivered the album Zoot Allures directly to Warner that month, while bypassing DiscReet. Zappa had intended this as a double LP, but he was later forced to re-edit the release into a single LP at the insistence of Warner executives. Cohen countersued, claiming that the Warner release violated the terms of his Discreet contract with Zappa. So the final four albums of Zappa's recording contract were then assigned back to DiscReet.

Recording sessions
Läther was assembled by Zappa in 1977 from a wide variety of recording sessions stretching back as far as eight years, but mostly between 1972 and 1976. The tracks utilize a constantly changing cast of backing musicians. Most of the songs on Läther are linked together with bits of musical sound effects (musique concrète) and comic dialog from Zappa band members, Terry Bozzio, Patrick O'Hearn, and Davey Moire. More of these same bits, or "grouts" as Zappa allegedly called them, appear on other albums such as Sheik Yerbouti.

Basic tracks for Lemme Take You to the Beach were recorded during 1969 sessions for Hot Rats. The track was finished in 1976 at the Record Plant in Los Angeles. Down in De Dew comes from November 1972 sessions in New York and Los Angeles. For The Young Sophisticate is a 1973 studio recording from Bolic Sound and is different from the later live version on Tinsel Town Rebellion.

The album's opener Re-Gyptian Strut comes from December 1974 sessions at Caribou Ranch in Colorado. Flambe''' and Spider of Destiny were also recorded at the ranch with additional overdubs in 1976 at the Los Angeles Record Plant. These three are among the songs written by Zappa in 1972 for a stage musical called Hunchentoot. A full script exists, but the recordings of this project were never completed.

The most substantial work is The Adventures of Greggery Peccary, a story set to music, which lasts over 20 minutes. The piece is scored for a large orchestra and was recorded in Los Angeles between 1972 and 1974. More orchestral works come from a September 1975 session with the 37-piece Abnuceals Emuukha Electric Symphony Orchestra, which was recorded at Royce Hall with conductor Michael Zearott. Zappa said the 1975 orchestral sessions alone cost him about $200,000.

Most of the live tracks were recorded in December 1976 at the Palladium in New York City. The last recordings are live tracks including Tryin' to Grow a Chin from a February 1977 London show at the Hammersmith Odeon. This song also appeared in a different later recording on Sheik Yerbouti.

History
In April 1975 Zappa had a one-sided demo acetate disc cut at Kendun Recorders in Burbank, California. This unreleased disc contains "Revised Music for Guitar and Low-Budget Orchestra", "200 Years Old" and "Regyptian Strut". Zappa's liner notes in the June 1975 album One Size Fits All mention a planned studio follow up album which never appeared. Instead, Zappa released the (mostly) live album Bongo Fury in October 1975. Bongo Fury contained a four minute version of "200 Years Old" which was edited from the one on the April 1975 acetate.

A complete album titled Six Things was also cut as a demo acetate at Kendun in April 1976. This was an unreleased early edit of music from the Royce Hall orchestral sessions. The same year Zappa tried to negotiate release of an orchestral album with Columbia Masterworks, but the deal fell through when the label did not agree to Zappa's terms.

During the fall 1976 tour the Zappa band performed in front slide projector images, one of which said "Warner Bros. Sucks!" Zappa was upset over inadequate promotion. By late 1976 he was determined to complete his Warner contract as soon as possible. As early as December that year Zappa considered handing multiple individual albums over to Warner and had "more than four" currently in production. Contracts then stipulated that Zappa deliver four new albums to Warner for release on DiscReet. In December 1977 Zappa said:
"Between last October and December 31 of this year I was required to deliver to Warner Brothers four completed albums. I delivered all four in March of this year. According to the contract, upon receipt of the tapes, they have to pay me. They received the tapes and they did not pay me."

Warner was expecting to receive only one album at a time, not four. Upon delivery the label was required to pay an advance to Zappa of $60,000 per album ($240,000 total) and release the recordings in the United States within six weeks. Warner failed to honor these contractual terms. Zappa had paid in excess of $400,000 out of his own pocket to produce these tapes and in response, he filed a multi-million dollar breach of contract lawsuit.

During the long legal battle no Zappa material was released for more than a year. Most of the material on Läther would be released during 1978 and 1979 on Zappa in New York, Studio Tan, Sleep Dirt (previously titled Hot Rats III), and Orchestral Favorites. In an October 1978 radio interview, Zappa identified these four individual albums as the ones he previously delivered to Warner and added "Läther was made out of four albums. Warners has released two of them already and they have two more that they're probably gonna release."

The first of these four albums was a two-LP live jazz rock album and was produced with Zappa approved cover art. Two others were single disc jazz rock studio albums, while the last was made up of orchestral recordings. Therefore, the complete four individual album collection actually fills a total of five full-length LPs.

After having violated the contract with Zappa, Warner scheduled the release of Zappa in New York on DiscReet. A Warner Bros. Records advertisement in the June 30, 1977, issue of Rolling Stone magazine described the release of the album as "imminent". 

At approximately the same time Zappa was also planning a four-LP box set titled Läther. Final editing for the album was completed at the Los Angeles Record Plant and Zappa's handwriting on the tape boxes show either EMI or Arista as the intended client. Frank's wife Gail Zappa claimed that Warner, wary of a four-LP box, had declined to release the material in this format.Lowe, 2006, The Words and Music of Frank Zappa, p. 131.Miles, Barry (2004), Frank Zappa, p. 267. Both sets of recordings (five-LP and four-LP) have much of the same music, but each also has unique content. Zappa announced Läther in a mid September 1977 interview, following a concert in San Diego, where he described it as his "current album". Zappa also wanted to release sides two and four as a single album. He said "it's only the rock 'n' roll, for people who can't afford the box." The single album release never appeared.

Zappa attempted to get Läther released in the four-LP box configuration as the first release on the Zappa Records label. He briefly negotiated distribution with Capitol/EMI and then Phonogram Inc. At Phonogram the project reached the test pressing stage. Official documentation for the test pressing shows the project had a "Fixation Date" of 8/31/77 and a release scheduled for Halloween, October 31, 1977. But Warner interfered with these negotiations by claiming rights over the material. By this point Zappa had denied a music copyright license to Warner to reproduce the songs. 

An article in Billboard magazine, dated October 22, 1977, described the upcoming release of Zappa in New York from Warner. The same article also stated that Phonogram/Mercury would rush-release an all new four record set from Zappa with a list price of $27.92. A few uncensored full-length copies of Zappa in New York appeared but the album was quickly pulled from stores. Warner was forced to withdraw it by November due to legal action. Zappa objected to the release at this time and claimed that Warner began to manufacture the album only after they heard he had negotiated to release the recordings with a competing company.

In December 1977 Zappa appeared on the Pasadena, California, radio station KROQ-FM and played the entire test pressing of Läther. While encouraging listeners to record the broadcast Zappa also counterclaimed that Warner did not have rights to the material. The same month Zappa said his breach of contract suit against Warner Bros. was for five million dollars but he later claimed twenty million was at stake. Bootlegs of Läther soon appeared. Some came directly from the test pressing, but most were lower quality ones sourced from broadcast tapes. Until the album's official release in 1996 the bootlegs circulated widely.

Eventually, Warner issued all four individual albums starting in March 1978 and running through May of 1979. However, the label censored the 1978 version of Zappa in New York by removing the song Punky's Whips as well as other references to Punky Meadows, a member of the American glam rock band Angel. The change of album title from "Hot Rats III" to "Sleep Dirt" and editing of the material were also done in violation of Zappa's contract. Since Zappa had supplied only the tapes for the final three albums they were released without musician or songwriting credits. Also, the artwork for these albums was not approved by Zappa. Instead, Warner commissioned the designs from cartoonist Gary Panter. All four individual albums went out of print when the DiscReet/Warner distribution agreement ended in 1982.

 CD issues 
Zappa chose to re-issue the four previously released individual albums on CD in 1991 along with the Panter artwork and added credits. Each of them were either remixed and or altered in various ways. These albums appeared in the US on Zappa's Barking Pumpkin label.

In 1995 Rykodisc again reissued Zappa's entire catalog up to that date. None of the four albums related to Läther were altered from the original CD issues, though new analog to digital transfers were made.

One year later, Läther was released officially through Rykodisc as a three-CD album. This edition used new 1996 artwork and was released in a plastic jewel case. Gail Zappa confirmed that the stereo master tapes for the four-LP Läther box were used as the source. While Zappa's notes from the tape boxes show a slightly different track listing, the 1996 CD version of Läther is musically identical to the 1977 test pressings. The only difference is that four bonus tracks were also added. Among these is commentary from Zappa taken from his KROQ broadcast. Also, the title of the song "One More Time for the World" was changed to "The Ocean is the Ultimate Solution", the title under which the same song appears on the album Sleep Dirt.

Along with most of Zappa's material, a "mini-LP" CD edition was also released by Rykodisc in Japan, with the artwork reformatted to resemble the packaging of a vinyl album.

In December 2012 an official reissue of Läther appeared in cardboard packaging with the original intended 1977 artwork. This version omits the 1996 bonus tracks.

 Release and reception 

The official version of Läther was finally released with the authorization of Gail Zappa in September 1996, nearly three years after Frank's death.

It is still debated as to whether Zappa had conceived the material as a four-LP box set from the beginning, or only later when working with Phonogram around September–October 1977. In the liner notes to the 1996 release, Gail states that "As originally conceived by Frank, Läther was always a 4-record box set." Despite this claim, however, there is no evidence that Zappa ever delivered the four-LP Läther set to Warner, only the four individual albums. Zappa himself actually contradicted Gail's posthumous claims that Warner had broken up Läther into other albums.Interview with Gail Zappa in the 2020 film "Zappa" produced by Alex Winter Several interviews published in 1978 and an album review from 1996 explicitly state that Zappa re-edited the four individual albums into the Läther four-LP box and then presented it to Phonogram.

In a January 1978 Zappa interview the British publication New Musical Express'' said:
"Since his (Warner) contract had allegedly been breached, Zappa took his copy tapes of the four albums, added some new material, subtracted some old, and prepared a four-record set called "Läther", but pronounced "Leather".

Allmusic writer Richie Unterberger praised the album, but wrote that it would "appeal far more to the Zappa cultist than the general listener, though the Zappa cult – which has been craving Läther in its original format for years – is a pretty wide fan base in and of itself."

Track listing

Personnel 
 Disc One, Track 1
 Frank Zappa – percussion
 George Duke – keyboards
 Bruce Fowler – all brass
 James "Bird Legs" Youman – bass
 Ruth Underwood – percussion
 Chester Thompson – drums

 Disc One, Track 2; Disc Two, Track 7 & 10
 Frank Zappa – guitar
 Dave Parlato – bass
 Terry Bozzio – drums
 Emil Richards – percussion
 Orchestra conducted by Michael Zearott

 Disc One, Track 3 (Part One)
 Frank Zappa – vocal
 George Duke – keyboards

 Disc One, Track 3 (Part Two)
 Frank Zappa – lead guitar
 Andre Lewis – keyboards
 Roy Estrada – bass
 Terry Bozzio – drums

 Disc One, Track 4, 7 & 8; Disc Three Track 6
 Frank Zappa – guitar, vocals
 Ray White – guitar, vocals
 Eddie Jobson – violin, keyboards
 Patrick O'Hearn – bass
 Terry Bozzio – drums, vocals

 Disc One, Track 5
 Frank Zappa – all guitars, bass
 Jim Gordon – drums

 Disc One, Track 6
 Frank Zappa – lead guitar, vocals
 George Duke – keyboards
 Tom Fowler – bass
 Ralph Humphrey – drums
 Ricky Lancelotti – vocals

 Disc One, Track 9; Disc Two, Track 1, 2, 3, 4, 6, 8; Disc Three, Track 2
 Frank Zappa – lead guitar, vocals
 Ray White – rhythm guitar, vocals
 Eddie Jobson – violin, keyboards, vocals
 Patrick O'Hearn – bass, vocals
 Terry Bozzio – drums, vocals
 Ruth Underwood – percussion, synthesizer
 Dave Samuels – timpani, vibes
 Randy Brecker – trumpet
 Michael Brecker – tenor sax, flute
 Lou Marini – alto sax, flute
 Ronnie Cuber – baritone sax, clarinet
 Tom Malone – trombone, trumpet, piccolo
 Don Pardo – sophisticated narration

 Disc One, Track 10
 Frank Zappa – guitar, vocals
 Davey Moire – vocals
 Eddie Jobson – keyboards, yodeling
 Max Bennett – bass
 Paul Humphrey – drums
 Don Brewer – bongos

 Disc One, Track 11; Disc Three, Track 4
 Frank Zappa – guitar, vocals
 George Duke – keyboards
 Bruce Fowler – trombone
 Tom Fowler – bass
 Chester Thompson – drums

 Disc One, Track 12; Disc Three, Track 8
 Frank Zappa – guitar
 George Duke – keyboards
 James "Bird Legs" Youman – bass
 Ruth Underwood – percussion
 Chester Thompson – drums

 Disc Two, Track 5 & 9
 Frank Zappa – guitar
 George Duke – keyboards
 Patrick O'Hearn – bass
 Ruth Underwood – percussion
 Chester Thompson – drums

 Disc Three, Track 1
 Frank Zappa – guitar, keyboards
 Dave Parlato – bass
 Terry Bozzio – drums

 Disc Three, Track 3
 Frank Zappa – guitar, synthesizer
 Patrick O'Hearn – bass
 Terry Bozzio – drums

 Disc Three, Track 5
 Frank Zappa – percussion
 George Duke – keyboards
 Bruce Fowler – all brass
 James "Bird Legs" Youman – bass
 Ruth Underwood – percussion
 Chad Wackerman – drum overdubs

 Production credits
 Digital Mastering & EQ – Spencer Chrislu
 Transfer Engineers – David Dondorf, Spencer Chrislu
 Vaultmeisterment – Joe Travers
 Bonus Section Assembly, Edits & Mastering – Spencer Chrislu
 Cover Concept – Dweezil Zappa
 Forward Motion – Gail Zappa
 Deep-dish Descriptions – Simon Prentis
 Cover Execution & Layout Design – Steven Jurgensmeyer

References 

1996 albums
Albums published posthumously
Frank Zappa albums
Rykodisc albums